Girl on the Run is Victoria Silvstedt's first and only studio album. It was released in 1999 and produced and managed by Huma. It includes the three singles: "Hello Hey", "Rocksteady Love" and "Party Line".

Track listing

Chart performance

References

External links
On Discogs
swedishcharts.com Girl on the Run

1999 debut albums